Trilby is a 1912 Austrian silent horror film, written and directed by Anton Kolm, Luise Kolm, Jacob Fleck, and Claudius Veltée. The screenplay is based on the novel by the same name by George du Maurier.

The film starred Paul Askonas as the Hungarian musician Svengali, and Elsa Galafrés as Trilby, a young singer hypnotised and dominated by Svengali.

At the time of its release, it was the longest film produced in Austria.

References

1912 films
Austrian silent feature films
Films based on British novels
Films based on works by George du Maurier
Trilby (novel)